Bobrovsky 1-y is a rural locality (a khutor) in Ust-Khopyorskoye Rural Settlement, Serafimovichsky District, Volgograd Oblast, Russia. The population was 190 as of 2010. There are 5 streets.

Geography 
Bobrovsky 1-y is located 47 km west of Serafimovich (the district's administrative centre) by road. Zimovnoy is the nearest rural locality.

References 

Rural localities in Serafimovichsky District